The 1958–59 Sussex County Football League season was the 34th in the history of the competition.

Division 1 remained at sixteen teams and Lancing was promoted from Division 2. Division 2 was increased to sixteen teams with Burgess Hill joining. from which the winner would be promoted into Division 1.

Division One
The division featured 16 clubs, 15 which competed in the last season, along with one new club:
Lancing, promoted from last season's Division Two

League table

Division Two
The division featured 16 clubs, 14 which competed in the last season, along with two new clubs:
Brighton Old Grammarians, relegated from last season's Division One
Burgess Hill

League table

References

1958-59
9